The 2023 international cricket season is scheduled to take place from May 2023 to September 2023. 14 Test matches, 24 One Day Internationals (ODIs) and 22 Twenty20 Internationals (T20Is), as well as one Women's Test match, 6 Women's One Day Internationals (WODIs) and 6 Women's Twenty20 Internationals (WT20Is) are scheduled to be played during this period. The 2023 Cricket World Cup Qualifier is scheduled to take place in Zimbabwe in June and July.

Season overview

May

Ireland vs Bangladesh in England

June

Ireland in England

World Test Championship Final

Australia in England

Australia women in England

Afghanistan in Bangladesh

India in West Indies

2023 Cricket World Cup Qualifier

July

Pakistan in Sri Lanka

August

New Zealand in the UAE

India in Ireland

Australia in South Africa

New Zealand in England

September

Sri Lanka women in England

See also
 Associate international cricket in 2023

Notes

References

2023 in cricket